The Men's Individual Time Trial at the 2005 UCI Road World Championships was held on the second day of the event. Australian Michael Rogers took his third straight crown as TT World Champion, after winning in 2003 in Hamilton (Canada) and in 2004 in Bardolino (Italy).

Final classification

References
 Race website
 cyclingnews

Men's Time Trial
UCI Road World Championships – Men's time trial